Wilhelm Strasse may refer to:

Wilhelmstrasse, a street in the Mitte and Kreuzberg districts of Berlin, Germany
Wilhelmstraße (Spandau), a street in the Spandau district of Berlin
Wilhelmstraße (Wiesbaden), a street in Wiesbaden, Hesse, Germany
Marshal Ferdinand Foch Street, Bydgoszcz, Poland, originally Wilhelmstraße
Wilhelmstrasse trial, or Ministries Trial, the Nuremberg trial of foreign ministry officials after World War II
Wilhelm Strasse, a character in the 2001 video game Return to Castle Wolfenstein

Wilhelmstrasse